Lintneria phalerata is a moth of the  family Sphingidae. It is known from Argentina and Bolivia.

The length of the forewings is 40–45 mm. Adults have been recorded from January to March and in November.

The larvae probably feed on Lamiaceae (such as Salvia, Mentha, Monarda and Hyptis), Hydrophylloideae (such as Wigandia) and Verbenaceae species (such as Verbena and Lantana).

References

Lintneria
Moths described in 1955